Sport plays an important role in rural and regional Australia. Sport has been found to contribute to community identity, sense of place, social interaction and better health. Rural and regional Australian towns and cities are increasingly hosting sporting events that provide an economic stimulus and a sense of pride. These towns and cities have also developed many of Australia's elite athletes due to their unique social environment.

The importance of sport was highlighted by the fact that "After the general store, the pub and the cemetery, one of the first things established in many a fledgling Australian country town was a sporting facility. Commonly it was a racetrack, sometimes a footy ground or tennis court carved out of someone's back paddock; if the climate was hot and there was ample water, possibly a pool."

Rural sports

Many sports are the predominantly or exclusively played in rural areas. These sports often reflect the skills required to work in rural areas and include: polo, polocrosse, rodeo, campdrafting, tent pegging, endurance horse riding, woodchopping, shearing sports and Sheep Dog Trials.

List of Sporting Events
Many Australian regional and rural towns have or currently host major sporting events. These events are used to showcase the town and assist in developing community spirit. Increasingly they are being used to provide an economic stimulus to towns. Examples of current and former events are listed in the table below.

Sportspeople
A research term "Wagga effect" was devised to describe the disproportionately high number of elite sports men and women who come from Australian regional and rural cities. It is argued that regional and rural cities offer children more space to play, a range of sports, participation with adults due to low participation numbers and local sporting heroes. It has been stated that 60 per cent of the Australian team at the 2004 Athens Olympics grew up in rural and regional Australia. Besides developing international athletes, many Australian Football League (AFL) and National Rugby League players have their origins in country areas. In 2010, one-third of AFL players came from country Victoria.

Recognition

Several cities and towns have erected statues to recognise sportspeople and horses. These include: 

 Athletes – Marjorie Jackson in Lithgow, New South Wales, Cliff Young in Beech Forest, Victoria
 Australian rules footballers – John Coleman in Hastings, Victoria, Darrel Baldock in Launceston, Tasmania
 Boxers – Les Darcy in East Maitland, New South Wales
 Cricketers – Adam Gilchrist in Bellingen, New South Wales, Glenn McGrath in Narromine, New South Wales, Don Bradman in Cootamundra, New South Wales
 Cyclists – Hubert Opperman in Rochester, Victoria
 Tennis players – Evonne Goolagong-Cawley in Barellan, New South Wales
 Racehorses – Gunsynd in Goondiwindi, Queensland, Black Caviar in Nagambie, Victoria, Paleface Adios in Temora, New South Wales, Bernborough in Oakey, Queensland, Patrobus in Rosedale, Victoria

In addition, many sportspeople from cities and towns have sports field and facilities named after them. Examples are:

See also
Sport in Australia

Further reading
Burdon, Amanda, Good sports : sport – whatever the code, whichever the team – provides a rich backdrop to life in the bush, R.M. Williams Outback, (2009/2010), 68 36–44
 Mugford, Stephen, The Status of Sport in Rural and Regional Australia – Literature, Research and Policy Options, (2001), Canberra, Sports Industry Australia.
Tonts, Matthew, Competitive sport and social capital in rural Australia, Journal of Rural Studies (2005) 21 137–149
Whimpress, Bernard, Regionalism in Oxford Companion to Australian Sport, (1994) 2nd ed, Melbourne, Oxford University Press 345–348

References

Sport in Australia
Rural organisations in Australia